Ivan Čeliković (born 10 April 1989) is a Croatian footballer who plays for NK Lokomotiva as a left back.

Career
Born in Nova Gradiška, Čeliković arrived in Inter Zaprešić in 2012 after starting his career with Konavljanin in 2009. In September 2015, he scored his first goal in the Croatian First Football League, finding the net in the 94th minute of a 3–1 defeat against Osijek. In February of the follow8ng year, it was announced that Spanish club Rayo Vallecano were interested in securing the services of him. He was also included in the team of the season in the 2015–16 Croatian First Football League Team of the Season

In January 2017, Čeliković switched clubs and countries and signed for Macedonian club Shkëndija where he penned a one-year contract. He scored his first goal for the club in a draw against Finnish club HJK Helsinki.

References

External links 
 
 

1989 births
Living people
Association football defenders
Croatian Football League players
Croatian footballers
Croatian expatriate footballers
HNK Hajduk Split players
NK Solin players
NK Inter Zaprešić players
KF Shkëndija players
NK Lokomotiva Zagreb players
Expatriate footballers in North Macedonia
Croatian expatriate sportspeople in North Macedonia
People from Nova Gradiška